Alexandru Plamădeală (1888–1940) was a Moldovan sculptor. He was the artist responsible for the creation of the Stephen the Great Monument in Chișinău (1927).

He graduated from the Moscow School of Painting, Sculpture and Architecture.

Alexandru Plamădeală married Olga Suceveanu on September 19, 1923.

He died in Chișinău in 1940.

Gallery

Notes

1888 births
1940 deaths
Artists from Chișinău
Moldovan sculptors
20th-century sculptors
Moscow School of Painting, Sculpture and Architecture alumni